Hiraku Hori (born April 3, 1982) is a retired Japanese heavyweight kickboxer. A professional from 2001 until 2010, he competed almost exclusively in K-1.

Career
Hori made his professional debut at K-1 Survival 2001, winning via third-round knockout. After winning four of his next five, he faced MMA fighter Kazuhiro Nakamura at K-1 Beast 2003. After a competitive first round, Hori used his large reach advantage to attack Nakamura with a series of left roundhouse kicks, then knocked him out with a high kick.

Hori was then pitted against fellow Japanese prospect Tatsufumi Tomihara in the quarterfinals of the K-1 Survival 2003 Japan Grand Prix. He won via decision, and moved on to face Musashi, the premiere heavyweight Japanese star at the time. Hori lost via TKO due to a low kick.

With a 6-2 professional record, Hori was then matched up with Samoan Mighty Mo at K-1 Burning 2004. The bout was Mo's K-1 debut, and after the judges declared the fight would go to the overtime fourth round, he defeated Hori with a knockout. Hori then fought Cyril Abidi in a valiant effort, losing via TKO with just two seconds left in the fight.

Hori then fought in the K-1 Beast 2004 tournament on June 26, 2004. After winning the quarterfinal match, Hori fought Nobu Hayashi, a 24-fight veteran at the time. Hori lost in the third round via knockout.

In the quarterfinals of the K-1 World Grand Prix 2005 in Hiroshima, Hori fought Tsuyoshi Nakasako. Hori won via decision.

Kickboxing record

|-  bgcolor="#FFBBBB"
| 2010-12-16 || Loss ||align=left| Eugene Orlov || KOK World GP 2010 in Russia || Moscow, Russia || Decision (3-0) || 3 || 3:00 || 13-14
|-  bgcolor="#CCFFCC"
| 2010-04-29 || Win ||align=left| Hukuda Yuuhei || Krush 9 || Japan || TKO (Corner stoppage) || 3 || 2:07 || 13-13
|-  bgcolor="#CCFFCC"
| 2009-03-21 || Win ||align=left| Tanigawa Takeshi || Krush 6 || Japan || KO (Punches) || 2 || 1:09 || 12-13
|-  bgcolor="#FFBBBB"
| 2009-03-28 || Loss ||align=left| Takumi Sato || K-1 World Grand Prix 2009 in Yokohama || Yokohama, Japan || TKO || 3 || 1:19 || 11-13
|-  bgcolor="#FFBBBB"
| 2007-10-13 || Loss ||align=left| Maxsim Neledva || K-1 Fighting Network Latvia 2007 || Yokohama, Japan || KO ||  ||  || 11-12
|-  bgcolor="#FFBBBB"
| 2007-03-04 || Loss ||align=left| Aleksandr Pitchkounov || K-1 World Grand Prix 2007 in Yokohama || Yokohama, Japan || KO || 1 || 2:27 || 11-11
|-  bgcolor="#CCFFCC"
| 2006-12-02 || Win ||align=left| Kyoung Suk Kim || K-1 World Grand Prix 2006 in Tokyo Final || Tokyo, Japan || Decision (3-0) || 3 || 3:00 || 11-10 
|-  bgcolor="#FFBBBB"
| 2006-06-03 || Loss ||align=left| Peter Aerts || K-1 World Grand Prix 2006 in Seoul || Seoul, South Korea || KO (Left high kick) || 2 || 1:23 || 10-10 
|-  bgcolor="#FFBBBB"
| 2006-05-03 || Loss ||align=left| Jason Suttie || K-1 World Grand Prix 2006 in Auckland || Auckland, New Zealand || KO || 3 || 1:34 || 10-9
|-  bgcolor="#CCFFCC"
| 2006-05-03 || Win ||align=left| Cyril Abidi || K-1 World Grand Prix 2006 in Auckland || Auckland, New Zealand || TKO (Corner stoppage) || 2 || 3:00 || 10-8
|-  bgcolor="#FFBBBB"
| 2005-08-13 || Loss ||align=left| Chalid Arrab || K-1 World Grand Prix 2005 in Las Vegas II || Las Vegas, United States || Decision (3-0) || 3 || 3:00 || 9-8 
|-  bgcolor="#FFBBBB"
| 2004-06-14 || Loss ||align=left| Bob Sapp || K-1 World Grand Prix 2005 in Hiroshima || Hiroshima, Japan || KO || 2 || 1:54 || 9-7
|-  bgcolor="#CCFFCC"
| 2005-06-14 || Win ||align=left| Tsuyoshi Nakasako || K-1 World Grand Prix 2005 in Hiroshima || Hiroshima, Japan || Decision (3-0) || 3 || 3:00 || 9-6
|-  bgcolor="#FFBBBB"
| 2005-03-19 || Loss ||align=left| Kaoklai Kaennorsing || K-1 World Grand Prix 2005 in Seoul || Seoul, South Korea || Decision (3-0) || 3 || 3:00 || 8-6
|-  bgcolor="#CCFFCC"
| 2005-03-19 || Win ||align=left| Myeon Ju Lee || K-1 World Grand Prix 2005 in Seoul || Seoul, South Korea || Decision (3-0) || 3 || 3:00 || 8-5 
|-  bgcolor="#FFBBBB"
| 2004-06-26 || Loss ||align=left| Nobu Hayashi || K-1 Beast 2004 || Shizuoka, Japan || KO || 3 || 2:31 || 7-5
|-  bgcolor="#CCFFCC"
| 2004-06-26 || Win ||align=left| Shingo Koyasu || K-1 Beast 2004 || Shizuoka, Japan || Decision (3-0) || 3 || 3:00 || 7-4
|-  bgcolor="#FFBBBB"
| 2004-03-27 || Loss ||align=left| Cyril Abidi || K-1 World Grand Prix 2004 in Saitama || Saitama, Japan || TKO || 3 || 2:58 || 6-4
|-  bgcolor="#FFBBBB"
| 2004-02-15 || Loss ||align=left| Mighty Mo || K-1 Burning 2004 || Okinawa, Japan || KO (Right hook) || Ex R 4 || 1:22 || 6-3
|-  bgcolor="#FFBBBB"
| 2003-09-21 || Loss ||align=left| Musashi || K-1 Survival 2003 Japan Grand Prix || Yokohama, Japan || KO (Left kow kick) || 2 || 3:00 || 6-2
|-  bgcolor="#CCFFCC"
| 2003-09-21 || Win ||align=left| Tatsufumi Tomihira || K-1 Survival 2003 Japan Grand Prix || Yokohama, Japan || Decision (2-0) || 3 || 3:00 || 6-1 
|-  bgcolor="#CCFFCC"
| 2003-06-29 || Win ||align=left| Kazuhiro Nakamura || K-1 Beast II 2003 || Yokohama, Japan || K0 (Left high kick) || 2 || 1:58 || 5-1 
|-  bgcolor="#CCFFCC"
| 2003-04-06 || Win ||align=left| Kazushi Nishida || K-1 Beast 2003 || Yamagata, Japan || KO (Left knee)|| 2 || 1:11 || 4-1
|-  bgcolor="#FFBBBB"
| 2002-04-21 || Loss ||align=left| Ryo Takigawa || K-1 Burning 2002 || Hiroshima, Japan || KO (Right hook) || 2 || 1:02 || 3-1 
|-  bgcolor="#CCFFCC"
| 2001-08-19 || Win ||align=left| Masahide Aoyagi || K-1 Andy Memorial Japan GP Final || Saitama, Japan || Decision (3-0) || 2 || 0:39 || 3-0
|-  bgcolor="#CCFFCC"
| 2001-06-24 || Win ||align=left| Mitsuru Suzuki || K-1 Survival 2001 || Tokyo, Japan || KO (Left low kick) || 2 || 0:39 || 2-0
|-  bgcolor="#CCFFCC"
| 2001-04-15 || Win ||align=left| Ryoma || K-1 Burning 2001 || Kumamoto, Japan || KO (Knee) || 3 || 1:17 || 1-0
|-
| colspan=9 | Legend:

See also 
List of male kickboxers
List of K-1 Events

References

External links
Profile at K-1

1982 births
Living people
Japanese male kickboxers
Heavyweight kickboxers
Sportspeople from Sendai